Trichostema micranthum is a species of flowering plant in the mint family, known by the common name smallflower bluecurls.

Distribution
The plant is native to Southern California, northwestern Arizona, and northern Baja California state.  In California populations are found in the San Bernardino Mountains and San Emigdio Mountains of the Transverse Ranges.

Its habitat includes meadow wetlands and riparian riverbanks, often in white fir (Abies concolor) and Yellow pine forest habitats.

Description
Trichostema micranthum is an annual herb growing to under  in maximum height.

Its aromatic foliage is coated in short, glandular and nonglandular hairs. The pointed oval or lance-shaped leaves are up to 4.5 centimeters long.

The inflorescence is a series of clusters of flowers located at each leaf pair. Each flower has a hairy calyx of pointed sepals and a tubular, lipped purple corolla a few millimeters in length. The four stamens are sometimes protrude from the lips of the corolla.

References

External links
 Calflora Database: Trichostema micranthum (Small flowered bluecurls)
Jepson Manual eFlora (TJM2) treatment of Trichostema micranthum
USDA Plants Profile for Trichostema micranthum (smallflower bluecurls)
UC Photos gallery: Trichostema micranthum

micranthum
Flora of California
Flora of Arizona
Flora of Baja California
Natural history of the Transverse Ranges
~
Taxa named by Asa Gray
Flora without expected TNC conservation status